Progressive Coalition may refer to the following political parties:

Jim Anderton's Progressive Party, in New Zealand, formerly Progressive Coalition and Jim Anderton's Progressive Coalition
Vermont Progressive Party, in the United States, formerly the Progressive Coalition

See also
Progressive Party (disambiguation)